Malahide Castle, parts of which date to the 12th century, lies close to the village of Malahide, nine miles (14 km) north of central Dublin in Ireland.

History
The estate began in 1185, when Richard Talbot, a knight who accompanied Henry II to Ireland in 1174, was granted the "lands and harbour of Malahide." The oldest parts of the castle date back to the 12th century and it was home to the Talbot family for 791 years, from 1185 until 1976, the only exception being the period from 1649 to 1660, when Oliver Cromwell granted it to Miles Corbet after the Cromwellian conquest of Ireland; Corbet was hanged following the demise of Cromwell, and the castle was restored to the Talbots. The building was notably enlarged in the reign of Edward IV, with towers added in 1765.

The estate survived such losses as the Battle of the Boyne, when fourteen members of the owner's family sat down to breakfast in the Great Hall, and all were dead by evening, and the Penal Laws, even though the family remained Roman Catholic until 1774.

In 1918 during the First World War a mooring-out base for airships was established in the grounds of the castle, used by airships from RNAS Anglesey in Wales which conducted anti-submarine operations in the Irish Sea. There were plans to base airships here from 1919, but these were abandoned at the end of the war.

In the 1920s the private papers of James Boswell were discovered in the castle and sold to American collector Ralph H. Isham by Boswell's great-great-grandson Lord Talbot de Malahide. The papers have since passed to Yale University, which has published popular and scholarly editions of his journals and correspondence. A second cache was discovered soon after and also purchased by Isham.

Malahide Castle and its demesne was eventually inherited by the 7th Baron Talbot who had wanted to donate it to the state. On his death in 1973, the castle passed to his sister, Rose who had lived there as a caretaker in the 1950s. She had death duties to pay, and the government would not accept valuables, so they had to be sold. In 1975, Rose ceded the castle to the Irish State, with regret to fund the outstanding inheritance taxes. Many of the contents, notably furnishings, which had been sold, had caused some controversy. Private and governmental parties were able to retrieve some back from the purchasers.

Visiting
The castle, along with its subsidiary attractions, was for many years operated as a tourist attraction by Dublin Tourism, working with Fingal County Council, which owns the whole demesne.  The operating partner is now Shannon Heritage, which has in turn appointed subsidiary partners, most notably, for shop and café facilities, Avoca Handweavers.

The castle itself can be visited for a fee, on a guided-tour-only basis. In addition, it is possible to hire the famously Gothic Great Hall for private banquets. The castle's best-known rooms are the Oak Room, and the Great Hall, which displays Talbot family history.  In the courtyard behind the castle are a café and craft shop, and other retail facilities.

The Talbot Botanic Gardens, situated behind the castle, comprising several hectares of plants and lawns, a walled garden of 1.6 hectares and seven glasshouses, including a Victorian conservatory. Many plants from the southern hemisphere, notably Chile and Australia, are featured. The gardens showcase the plant collecting passion of the 7th Lord Talbot de Malahide in the mid 20th Century.

The demesne is one of few surviving examples of 18th century landscaped parks and has wide lawns surrounded by a protective belt of trees. It can be visited freely, with a number of entrances and car parking areas.

In addition to woodland walks, and a marked "exercise trail," the park features sports grounds, including a cricket pitch and several football pitches, a 9-hole par-3 golf course, an 18-hole pitch-and-putt course, tennis courts and a boules area.

Adjacent to the golfing facilities, and containing the access to them, is a pavilion which also contains a café and other facilities.

There is an extensive children's playground near the castle.

A seasonal road train operates in a loop from the vicinity of the castle to the railway station and back.  A Malahide castle and coastal tour bus begins its journeys in Malahide Castle and continues to Howth, with two daily departures.

Former exhibits
Two major exhibits were required to move away from the demesne in 2010–2011, as the park was prepared for a relaunch under new management.  One reopened in 2011, the other, after many delays, in 2020:
Tara's Palace Museum of Childhood was formerly located at Malahide Castle, but relocated to Powerscourt Estate near Enniskerry in 2011.
The Fry Model Railway was located at Malahide Castle from 1988 to 2010.  After many delays, it re-opened in 2020 at the restored Casino House, a former shooting lodge of the Talbot de Malahide family, located near the railway station.

Cricket

The cricket venue is located in the Lady Acre field and is home to Malahide Cricket Club.  It also attracts international fixtures with teams such as Australia, England and Pakistan.  In September 2013 using temporary grandstands and hospitality pavilions over 10,000 spectators were accommodated,  a record for the Island of Ireland.

Access
 
The main entrance to the demesne is off the Malahide Road, with access also possible from Malahide village. Dublin Bus route numbers 42, 102 and 142 lie along one side of the park, and Malahide Railway Station is near the castle end of the park.

Concert venue 
The grounds at Malahide Castle were opened as a new concert venue by Fingal County Council in summer 2007, with concerts by Arctic Monkeys, Pink, Joe Cocker, Al Green and Bell X1 amongst others. In 2008 performers included Neil Young, Radiohead, and Eric Clapton. Prince performed at the Castle on 30 July 2011.

In the summer of 2017 two more bands played at the venue, with a capacity of 20,000 people. The band Arcade Fire brought their 'Everything Now' tour to the venue. The next day, The 1975 performed.

More artists played the grounds in June 2018, including Chic featuring Nile Rodgers, Liam Gallagher, Gorillaz, Kodaline, and LCD soundsystem.

June 2019 saw more artists perform in the venue, over a longer period of time compared to previous years. Snow Patrol were followed by The Cure the following day, and Mumford & Sons performed on both the Friday and Saturday of the second weekend, with Noel Gallagher's High Flying Birds playing on Sunday. George Ezra performed on the Friday of the third and final weekend, with Lana Del Rey playing on the Saturday. In June 2023, Depeche Mode concert is taking place in this venue.

World Scout Moot 
The grounds of the castle was to have been the base camp of the 16th World Scout Moot, to be hosted by Scouting Ireland in July and August 2021.
The event was cancelled due to the COVID-19 pandemic.

See also
Baron Talbot of Malahide
Thomas Talbot

References

External links 

Malahide
Tourist attractions in Fingal
Castles in Fingal
Museums in Fingal
Historic house museums in the Republic of Ireland
Botanical gardens in the Republic of Ireland
Parks in Fingal
Buildings listed on the Fingal Record of Protected Structures